Eurymorion is a genus of South American dwarf spiders that was first described by Norman I. Platnick in 1993.

Species
 it contains five species:
Eurymorion insigne (Millidge, 1991) (type) – Brazil
Eurymorion mourai Rodrigues & Ott, 2010 – Brazil
Eurymorion murici Rodrigues & Ott, 2010 – Brazil
Eurymorion nobile (Millidge, 1991) – Brazil
Eurymorion triunfo Rodrigues & Ott, 2010 – Bolivia, Brazil

See also
 List of Linyphiidae species (A–H)

References

Araneomorphae genera
Linyphiidae
Spiders of South America